The Hunter of Fall (German: Der Jäger von Fall) is a 1918 German silent drama film directed by and starring Ludwig Beck. It is based on the 1883 novel The Hunter of Fall by Ludwig Ganghofer.

Cast
 Ludwig Beck as Lenzl 
 Viktor Gehring as Jäger Friedl  
 Fritz Greiner as Blasi  
 Franz Gruber  
 Josef Kirchner-Lang 
 Thea Steinbrecher as Modei  
 Toni Wittels as Försterin

References

Bibliography
 Goble, Alan. The Complete Index to Literary Sources in Film. Walter de Gruyter, 1999.

External links

1918 films
Films of the Weimar Republic 
German silent feature films
Films based on The Hunter of Fall
German black-and-white films
German drama films
1918 drama films
Silent drama films
1910s German films
1910s German-language films